Elachista scirpi is a moth of the family Elachistidae found in Europe.

Description
The head is grey-whitish. Forewings are as in E. rhynchosporella, but fuscous markings more undefined,apex of fascia not distinctly produced, a distinct minute black apical dot. Hindwings are rather dark grey.The larva is pale greenish -yellow dorsal line indistinct ; head pale yellow grey.

Adults are on wing from June to August.

The larvae feed on round-fruited rush (Juncus compressus), saltmarsh rush (Juncus gerardii) and sea club-rush (Bolboschoenus maritimus). They mine the leaves of their host plant. The mine starts as a narrow corridor halfway down the leaf and ascends towards the tip. It then doubles and descends to about the starting point, gradually widening. The frass is deposited in the oldest part of the mine. Pupation takes place outside of the mine in a pupa in a loose spinning. They are pale greenish yellow with a pale yellow head. Larvae can be found from early March to early May.

Distribution
It is found from Fennoscandia to Portugal, Sardinia and Sicily and from Ireland to Romania.

References

scirpi
Leaf miners
Moths described in 1887
Moths of Europe
Taxa named by Henry Tibbats Stainton